The Brantly 305 is an American five-seat light helicopter of the 1960s.  It is an enlarged version of the Brantly B-2 which was produced by the Brantly Helicopter Corporation.

Design and development
The five-seater Model 305 helicopter is based on the smaller two-seat Brantly B-2 that was designed by Newby O. Brantly. The helicopter is powered by a Lycoming IVO-540 flat six piston engine. The enlarged cabin has room for five passengers, two side-by-side forward-facing seats and a bench seat at the rear for three passengers.  The Model 305 first flew during January 1964 and FAA type approval was received 29 July 1965.  45 were built during the mid 60's by Brantly and Brantly-Hynes produced an improved version in 1985 of which 4 were built. The Brantly 305 suffered from a ground resonance problems.  Hynes developed a more powerful and streamline version in 1993, none were produced.

Specifications

See also

References

Taylor, John W.R. Jane's All The World's Aircraft 1976-77. London:Jane's Yearbooks, 1976. .
 The Illustrated Encyclopedia of Aircraft (Part Work 1982-1985), 1985, Orbis Publishing.

1960s United States helicopters
1960s United States civil utility aircraft
305
Aircraft first flown in 1964
Single-engined piston helicopters